Canyon Glacier is a narrow glacier,  long, flowing to the Ross Ice Shelf. It drains the northwest slopes of Mount Wexler and moves northward between steep canyon walls of the Separation Range and Hughes Range to join the ice shelf immediately west of Giovinco Ice Piedmont. The glacier was observed from nearby Mount Patrick by the New Zealand Alpine Club Antarctic Expedition (1959–60) who gave the descriptive name.

References 

Glaciers of Dufek Coast